"Riverside Hotel" (リバーサイド・ホテル) is the fourth single by Kiyotaka Sugiyama & Omega Tribe, released by  VAP on October 21, 1984. The single charted at No. 21 on the Oricon charts and at No. 15 on The Best Ten, being included on their third studio album, Never Ending Summer.

The single features a European melody on 16 beats, which was not found in Omega Tribe songs and was introduced by their composer and arranger Tetsuji Hayashi.

Track listing

Charts

References 

1984 singles
Omega Tribe (Japanese band) songs
Songs with lyrics by Chinfa Kan
1984 songs
Songs written by Tetsuji Hayashi